Bloomingport is an unincorporated community in Washington Township, Randolph County, in the U.S. state of Indiana.

History
Bloomingport was laid out as Bloomingsport in about 1828. A post office called Bloomingport was established in 1851, and remained in operation until 1905.

Geography

References

Unincorporated communities in Randolph County, Indiana
Unincorporated communities in Indiana